Simon Says is a children's game for three or more players. One player takes the role of "Simon" and issues instructions (usually physical actions such as "jump in the air" or "stick out your tongue") to the other players, which should be followed only when prefaced with the phrase "Simon says". Players are eliminated from the game by either following instructions that are not immediately preceded by the phrase, or by failing to follow an instruction which does include the phrase "Simon says". It is the ability to distinguish between genuine and fake commands, rather than physical ability, that usually matters in the game; in most cases, the action just needs to be attempted.

The object for the player acting as Simon is to get all the other players out as quickly as possible; the winner of the game is usually the last player who has successfully followed all of the given commands. Occasionally, however, two or more of the last players may all be eliminated at the same time, thus resulting in Simon winning the game.

The game is embedded in popular culture, with numerous references in films, music, and literature.

Other languages
This game has translated across multiple cultures from seemingly common routes and some international versions also use the name Simon such as:
 Afrikaans: "Kolonel Bevel" ("Colonel commands")
 Arabic: for example :"نبيلة قالت هاكا" "(Algeria) Nabila said like so or "قال المعلّم" ("The teacher says", Lebanon) and "سلمان يقول" ("Salman says", Iraq)
 Basque: "Buruak dio" or "Buruzagiak dio" (The leader says), or "Unaik dio" (Unai says)
 Bengali: "নেতা বলেছেন" ("The leader says")
 Cantonese Chinese: "老師話" ("The teacher says")
 Czech: "Simon říká" (or with similar rules "Všechno lítá, co peří má")
 Danish: "Simon siger", "Kongen befaler"
 Dutch: "Simon zegt", "Commando" (the Dutch noun for "command"), or "Jantje zegt" ("Johnny says") in Flemish parts of Belgium
 Esperanto: "Zamenhof diris" (Zamenhof said)
 Finnish: "Kapteeni käskee" ("The captain commands")
 French: "Jacques a dit" ("Jack said") in France, or "Jean dit" ("John says") in Quebec
 Filipino: "Sabi ni Simon"
 German: "Kommando Pimperle" (or with similar rules "Alle Vögel fliegen hoch")
 Greek: "Ο Σιμών λέει" ('O Simón léi')
 Hausa: "Malam Kiri" 
 Hebrew: "הרצל אמר" ("Herzl said") or "המלך אמר" ("The King said")
 Hungarian: "Simon mondja"
 Icelandic: "Símon segir"
 Indonesian: "Simon Bilang"
  Irish: "Deir Síomón"
 Japanese: "船長さんの命令" ('Senchō-san no meirei', "Ship Captain's orders")
 Korean: "시몬 가라사대" ("Simon says")
 Marathi: "शिवाजी महाराज म्हणाले" ("Shivaji Maharaj says")
 Mandarin Chinese："老师说"（Lǎoshīshuō, "The teacher says"）
 Norwegian: "Kongen befaler" ("The king commands")
 Polish: "Szymon mówi" (the native counterpart is "Ojciec Wirgiliusz", Father Virgil)
 Portuguese: "O rei manda" ("the king orders"), or "O mestre mandou" ("The master ordered") in Brazilian Portuguese
 Spanish: "Mando, mando" ("I command, I command"), or "Simon dice" ("Simon says")
 Turkish: "Yakup der ki" ("Jacob says")
 Vietnam: "Tôi bảo" ("I say")

Gameplay and variants
A command starting with "Simon says" means that the players must obey that command. A command without the beginning "Simon says" means do not do this action. Anyone who breaks one of these two rules is eliminated from the remainder of the game. Often, anyone who speaks is also eliminated.

There can be very complex and difficult command chains, such as "Simon says: Arms up. Simon says: Arms down. Arms up." Anyone ending with their arms up is eliminated, because a command that doesn't begin with "Simon says" cannot be obeyed.

It is considered cheating to give impossible commands ("Simon says, lift both of your legs up and keep them there!") or phrase the commands in such a way that the other player has no option but to 'go out' ("Simon says, jump up. Come down."). However, at least in some versions, it is allowed for Simon to eliminate players by asking them to do something seemingly unrelated to the game (example: "Anyone remaining join me up here.").

Simon
The electronic game Simon is named for Simon Says. Instead of having to listen to the presence of the instruction phrase, the player has to repeat a short sequence of button presses after demonstration by the device. This gameplay has been repeated as minigame in many subsequent video games and is often confusingly referred to as "Simon Says" as well, despite the differences from the playground game.

Do This, Do That
A variation on the instruction phrases is used in this variant. Instead of only actions beginning with "Simon says" having to be obeyed, an action along with the phrase "do this" must be obeyed while an action with the phrase "do that" must not be obeyed. Obeying a "do that" command or not obeying a "do this" command will eliminate a player. In Swedish, this variant is known as Gör si, gör så.

In the late 1930s in New Zealand, non commissioned officers were leading troops in a brain stimulation game as part of training classed as informal activities called, 'do this, do that'.

Bird Fly
This variant, found in India, Pakistan, Germany, Slovakia, Czech Republic and Hungary, puts the focus on the specifics of the instruction phrase. The Simon announces the phrase "All X fly" or similar (i.e. "Chidiya ud" (Hindi) which translates to Bird fly or "Alle Vögel fliegen hoch" (German) which is "All birds fly up"), with the subject replaced by various creatures and objects. If the subject can fly, the other children have to perform an action, but have to stay still if it cannot fly. The action is usually fixed, involving raising the arms or jumping.

Following John

A similar Swedish child's game is "Följa John" meaning "following John", where physical actions are conducted by "John" (usually involving movement in a line), and where remaining participants are replicating the activities shown by John. However, the commands are silent, and based on the remaining participants observation of John's actions. Especially when performed in a line, this can become a physical action equivalent of the game Telephone.

Cultural references

The phrase has been used multiple times as a plot device in films and television dramas including Die Hard with a Vengeance, Police Academy, Demolition Man, The Gift and the TV series Underdog and Supernatural, as well as being played in television game shows including 1970s show Superstars and Battle of the Network Reality Stars.
The phrase occurs twice in Thelma and Louise for comic effect: "Simon says everybody lay down on the floor." First the outlaw on the run character J.D. (Brad Pitt) tells how he usually sets off to do an armed robbery. Later on it is found out in the only flashback scene of the movie that Thelma (Geena Davis) uses exactly the same phrase when robbing a store.
In an episode of the Cartoon Network show Courage the Cowardly Dog, the title character (disguised as an eggplant) gives commands to the other eggplants after saying "The Great Eggplant says".
The Peanuts special It's Flashbeagle, Charlie Brown includes a song/dance number called "Lucy Says" where Lucy plays the role of Simon, but uses "Lucy Says" instead of "Simon Says".
In the Animaniacs episode, "King Yakko", Yakko, as king of Anvilania gets his men to take their seats, but when they are about to do so, Yakko stops them, saying, "I didn't say 'Simon Says'!" Then he tells them, "Simon says take your seats!" which they follow.
A stunt played on the game show Fun House also played Simon Says, but was changed to "Tiny Says" to match the name of the show's announcer giving the commands.
The Pajanimals play a similar game called "Cowbella Says." Similar to the Peanuts example above, Cowbella, one of the Pajanimals, plays the role of Simon and uses "Cowbella Says" instead of "Simon Says". Before they play, there is a short song that has the lyrics "If Cowbella says, 'Cowbella Says,' you must do what Cowbella says; and if she doesn't say 'Cowbella Says,' you must not do what Cowbella says!"
Mickey Mouskersize, a short in Disney Junior has a game called Mickey Says. Mickey plays the role of Simon, once in the middle of the game, Goofy and Minnie did what Mickey said when he did not say "Mickey Says".
In Let's Go Pocoyo, there is a game in some episodes called Fred Says. This is a simple game. Fred plays the role of Simon, however, the narrator always says "Fred Says" in each phrase. At the end, the narrator says "Fred Says: That's all."
In Phoenix Wright: Ace Attorney – Dual Destinies, the game's main prosecutor is Simon Blackquill, likely named after the game. He's a master of psychological manipulation, and his acts of manipulating the minds of others is compared to as Simon Says by other characters.
In an episode of Transformers: Rescue Bots, Cody uses the game to teach the Bots about obeying commands. He uses basic instructions such as "Turn right" and "raise your left arm". When he issues a command without stating "Simon says", Chase responds by stating "Simon did not authorize that last movement".
A literal arcade-based smartphone adaptation of "Simon Says" was released exclusively on Android on July 11, 2016, titled Simon Says Mobile. In this version, bodily gestures are replaced with mobile gestures, namely tapping, swiping and tilting. It is free-to-play with in-app purchases.  A sequel, Simon Says Mobile 2: Reloaded, was released on July 11, 2021.
 In a Barney & Friends episode titled "Hop to It!", Barney and the kids play Simon Says. Two of them, Luci and Min, are out after touching their chins but the other two, Michael and Tina, remain. In Barney's Big Surprise, So Professor Tinkerputt play Simon Says part in the original 1996-1997 Big Surprise tour. Another episode, "All Mixed Up", also has Barney and the kids play Simon Says in which the educational theme of this episode is about following directions. "Movin' Along" is another episode to feature Simon Says.
In the 2015 novel Simon vs. the Homo Sapiens Agenda (and its 2018 film adaptation Love, Simon), protagonist Simon Spier's online pseudonym Jacques derived the French version of Simon Says, "Jacques a dit".
A single by K-Pop group NCT 127 was released November 2018 titled "Simon Says".
An episode of Sesame Street's Elmo's World has some kids playing Simon Says.
An episode of Sesame Street features Telly participating in a Simon Says competition with the other characters.
In a Knock Knock Show episode "Let's Play a Game", Dori plays "Simon Says", and Next Door Dawg plays the role of Simon and he plays "Simon Says".
A Gina D's Kids Club segment features Simon Wannabe playing "Simon Says".
In a Mustard Pancakes episode, Tiny Tina wins another round of "Simon Says" she changes to "Tiny Tina Says".
In the Sooty & Co. episode "Speedy Sweep", Matthew challenges Sooty and Sweep to a game of Simon Says to see who has the faster reflexes.
Episode 2 "Boston" of Cabin Pressure features the two pilots playing Simon Says.
In a Go, Diego, Go! episode called "Penguin School," a male Chinstrap penguin teacher plays Simon Says.
The title of The Raccoons episode is named after the game.
The Australian children’s music group, The Wiggles have a song based on the game titled ‘Simon Says’. The song is sung by one member of the group whose stage name is Simon Wiggle.
The 1910 Fruitgum Company had a hit with their song "Simon Says".
In an episode of Dragon Tales, Max, Emmy, and their dragon friends play the game, which is hosted by a gnome wizard named Simon.
A Miraculous: Tales of Ladybug and Cat Noir episode is named after the activity's name and features a villain named Simon who is able to take control of victims by throwing a card at them and giving them a command that starts with the phrase "Simon Says".

References

Other references
Arnold, Arnold, The World Book of Children's Games, World Publishing Co., 1972, .
Bancroft, Jessie H., Games for the Playground, Home, School and Gymnasium, The Macmillan Co., 1914.
Forster, Sally, Simon Says... Let's Play, Dutton Children's Books, 1990, .
Grunfeld, Frederic V., Games of the World: How to Make Them, How to Play Them, How They Came to Be, Holt, Rinehart and Winston, 1975, .

Children's games